Mycocitrus phyllostachydis is a fungus species in the family Bionectriaceae. It is a parasite of the Phyllostachys bamboos.

References

External links

Bionectriaceae
Fungi described in 1900